Thornton is a village in the Borough of Wyre, about  north of Blackpool and   south of Fleetwood. The civil parish of Thornton became an urban district in 1900, and was renamed Thornton-Cleveleys in 1927. In 2011 the Thornton built-up area sub division had a population of 18,941.

History
Thornton is first mentioned in 1086 in the Domesday Book, where it was referred to as Torentum (a name preserved by Torentum Court on Lawsons Road). At the time it covered a large area including what are now Cleveleys and Fleetwood, and had a very low population density. It is thought that a settlement had existed at the site since the Iron Age, and a Roman road passes close to the village. The area remained lightly populated until 1799, when the marshland around the village was drained and agricultural production began on a large scale.

A railway station was opened in Thornton in 1865. The opening of salt works at nearby Burn Naze by the United Alkali Company in the early 1890s (later becoming ICI) led to significant expansion of the village, with new houses and community buildings constructed. Thornton became an Urban District Council in 1900, surviving until 1974 when it became part of the Wyre Borough Council.

A notable early building, The Illawalla, stood in Skippool between 1902 and 1996.

In 2015, the complete skeleton of a pre-historic wolf, nicknamed the Thornton Wolf, was discovered in the back garden of a home in the village.

Transport

Rail 
Thornton–Cleveleys railway station was formerly the principal intermediate stop on the Fleetwood branch of the LMS/British Rail London Midland Region railway, running from Poulton-le-Fylde, but it has been years since the station was used, and with the recent fencing-over of the level crossing in Station Road/Victoria Road East in order to prevent youths from congregating on the tracks, the glory days of Thornton are long since gone. However, a decision by an action group based in Poulton means they will finance a feasibility study into bringing the railway back to Thornton and Fleetwood.

Bus 
Thornton Centre's stops 1 and 2 are served by five bus routes:

 Blackpool Transport routes 74 and 75, which originate at Albert Square in Fleetwood and terminate at Preston bus station
 Coastliner routes 24 and 660. The 24 originates in Fleetwood and terminates in Poulton-le-Fylde, while the weekday-only 660 originates in Cleveleys and terminates at Hodgson Academy in Poulton. The outbound journey arrives at Thornton Centre at 8.08 AM and the inbound return arrives at 3.07 PM
 Archway Travel route 525, which also runs only on weekdays, originates at Rossall Point in Fleetwood and terminates at Saint Aidan's Church of England High School in Preesall. The outbound journey departs Fleetwood at 7.20 AM and the inbound return departs at 3.10 PM

Amenities
Marsh Mill, a large well-preserved windmill, built in 1794, is a prominent landmark. It was commissioned by Bold Hesketh, uncle of Peter Hesketh (later Peter Hesketh-Fleetwood), who would go on to play a prominent role in the expansion of Fleetwood. Tragedy struck in May 1930, when a Miss Alice Baldwin and a Mrs Mary Jane Bailey visited the windmill with an interest in purchasing it. However, when both women stepped onto the fantail platform, the platform collapsed and the women fell to their deaths.

Thornton contains a number of schools, including Baines Endowed Primary School, Thornton Primary School, Stanah Primary School, Royles Brook Primary School, and Millfield Science & Performing Arts College in addition to a small public library.

Gallery

See also
Christ Church, Thornton

References

External links
Thornton Through Time
Thornton Community News - A locally-distributed news magazine

Villages in Lancashire
Geography of the Borough of Wyre
The Fylde